Italydella is a genus of parasitic flies in the family Tachinidae.

Species
Italydella chachapoyana Townsend, 1929
Italydella geminata Townsend, 1927

References

Diptera of South America
Exoristinae
Tachinidae genera
Taxa named by Charles Henry Tyler Townsend